Karl Solomon (born 13 October 1994) is a Caymanian footballer who plays as a defender for Bodden Town and the Cayman Islands national team.

Career statistics

References

External links

1994 births
Living people
Association football defenders
Caymanian footballers
Bodden Town F.C. players
Cayman Islands Premier League players
Cayman Islands international footballers